Monte Lazzu is an archaeological site in Casaglione, Corsica.

References

Archaeological sites in Corsica